Filipino actor Eddie Garcia has earned 43 notable awards. In the history of the Filipino Academy of Movie Arts and Sciences (FAMAS) Awards, he has the most recognition, having 38 nominations and bagging different kinds of wins, from Best Director to Best Actor. Garcia remains to be the only person to be inducted into the FAMAS Hall of Fame in three categories: Best Actor, Best Supporting Actor and Best Director.

International awards

Asia Pacific Film Festival

Asian Film Awards

Local awards

Cinemalaya Philippine Independent Film Festival

FAMAS Awards

Film Academy of the Philippines

Gawad Urian Award

Golden Screen Awards

Metro Manila Film Festival

PMPC Star Awards for Movies

References

Garcia, Eddie